HD 131551 (HR 5555) is a solitary star in the southern constellation Apus. It has an apparent magnitude of 6.19, allowing it to be faintly seen with the naked eye under ideal conditions. Located 526 light years away, the object is approaching the Sun with a heliocentric radial velocity of 7.6 .

HD 131551 has a stellar classification of B9 V, indicating that it is an ordinary B-type main-sequence star. At present it has 2.84 times the mass of the Sun and a radius of 3.19 . This object is 254 million years old – having completed 70.1% of its main sequence lifetime – and is spinning rapidly with a projected rotational velocity of 141 . HD 131551 has a similar metallicity compared to the Sun.

There is a 13th magnitude companion star at an angular separation of 34.5″ along a position angle of 123° (as of 2010).

References

External links
 Image HD 131551

Apus (constellation)
131551
Double stars
5555
B-type main-sequence stars
073394
Durchmusterung objects